Weathering nodules of ear is a cutaneous condition seen on the helices of the ears of Caucasian men who have a history of significant cumulative sun exposure.

See also 
 Zirconium granuloma
 List of cutaneous conditions
 Skin lesion

References 

Skin conditions resulting from physical factors